Musaeb Ibrahim Al-Momani (born 28 August 1986) is a Jordanian athlete competing in the discus throw and shot put. He represented his country in the discus at the 2013 World Championships without qualifying for the final. In addition, won a bronze medal at the 2019 Asian Championships.

International competitions

Personal bests
Outdoors
Shot put – 18.33 (Amman 2012) NR
Discus throw – 62.64 (Amman 2012) NR
Indoors
Shot put – 15.81 (Ashgabat 2017) NR

References

1986 births
Living people
Jordanian shot putters
Jordanian discus throwers
World Athletics Championships athletes for Jordan
20th-century Jordanian people
21st-century Jordanian people